The Decepticoaster (Chinese: 霸天虎过山车) is a launched roller coaster located at Universal Studios Beijing within the Universal Beijing Resort. The ride opened to the public on 20 September 2021, with the park.

History
On 13 October 2014, Universal Parks & Resorts CEO Thomas L. Williams announced a deal to construct a Universal Studios park in Beijing, with the park's attractions yet to be announced. In October 2020, Universal Parks & Resorts posted a video which detailed most of Universal Studios Beijing's attractions. The video confirmed the addition of the Decepticoaster, similar to The Incredible Hulk Coaster at Universal's Islands of Adventure. The roller coaster opened to the public on 20 September 2021 with the park.

Ride experience
The train then enters a small cave. Once exiting the cave, the train enters a corkscrew and another vertical loop before entering the mid-course brake run descending another hill into another corkscrew and a turn-around. The train then tilts sideways as the train enters a helix, which ends at the coaster's final brake run.

See also
 2021 in amusement parks
 The Incredible Hulk Coaster

References